Aswa may refer to:

Settlements and areas
Aswa County, a county in Uganda
Aswa, Uganda, a village in Uganda
Aswa, South Sudan, a village and IDP camp in South Sudan
Aswa-Lolim Game Reserve, a now-degazetted wildlife reserve in Uganda
Aswa Ranch a defunct beef ranch run by the parastatal Uganda Livestock Industries

Geology and hydrology
Achwa (also spelled Aswa, Asua and Assua), a river flowing from Uganda into South Sudan
Aswa Dislocation, a 300 km shear zone in Uganda, forming the channel of the above river
A small stream in Kibale, Uganda
A small stream in Nebbi, Uganda